Lindsay Marie Brewer (born April 17, 1997) is an American professional racing driver. She is set to compete in the 2023 USF Pro 2000 Championship for Exclusive Autosport.

Early life
Brewer was born in Arvada, Colorado. When she was 11 years old, she raced a go-kart at a friend's birthday party and became interested in the sport. From 2009 until 2014, Brewer competed in a variety of karting championships across the United States. In 2019, she graduated from San Diego State University with a degree in business.

Racing career
In 2019, Brewer competed in the Las Vegas Saleen Cup GT Series. She finished fifth in the Young Driver standings with 30 points. Following a hiatus in 2020, Brewer returned to racing in the 2021 TC America Series racing a Honda Civic sponsored by Skip Barber Racing School.  She finished the season in 14th place with 23.5 points. Her best result came at Sonoma Raceway.

Ahead of the 2022 W Series season, Brewer was selected to test for a drive in the series.  The test took place at Inde Motorsports Park in Arizona. She also tested an Indy Pro 2000 Championship car, and joined the series for the 2022 season with Exclusive Autosport. Brewer first raced in the series at Indianapolis, scoring an 8th place finish in her first race.  At Road America, Brewer was involved in an incident where her car was launched into the air by a kerb at turn 5, an identical incident happening on the same weekend for Christian Bogle in the Indy Lights series. Brewer finished the 2022 season in 15th place with 98 points and a best finish of 8th at Indianapolis. In October, Brewer confirmed she would return to race for Exclusive Autosport in the 2023 season, the inaugural year of its new title USF Pro 2000. She secured new sponsorship ahead of the season from Biocide Systems, and a return of title sponsor C4 Energy.

Personal life
Brewer resides in Newport Beach, California. In addition to racing, Brewer is a model with representation from the MN2S agency, alongside a large social media following and own premium website. In 2021, Brewer launched her own cryptocurrency, $LINDS, on the Rally platform, making her the first female professional race car driver to do so.

Racing record

Career summary 

* Season still in progress.

Complete Indy Pro 2000 Championship results 
(key) (Races in bold indicate pole position) (Races in italics indicate fastest lap)

References

1997 births
Living people
Racing drivers from Colorado
Racing drivers from Denver
American racing drivers
American female racing drivers
Indy Pro 2000 Championship drivers
American female models
San Diego State University alumni
Female models from Colorado